Ramat Magshimim (lit "Height of the Pioneers") is an Israeli settlement and moshav in the southern Golan Heights, under the administration of Israel.

The international community considers Israeli settlements in the Golan Heights illegal under international law.

History
The settlement was one of the first in the Golan Heights, and the first religious settlement. The community was established in 1968, initially living in abandoned houses in Fiq. After eight months they moved to an abandoned Syrian army camp adjacent to the current location, before moving again in the summer of 1972. At the time, the Golan Heights were part of the Israeli Military Governorate; in 1981, the area of Golan was unilaterally annexed by Israel, abolishing military occupation system and imposing Israeli civil rule on the area.

See also
Hesder

References

Israeli settlements in the Golan Heights
Golan Regional Council
Moshavim
Populated places in Northern District (Israel)
Populated places established in 1968
1968 establishments in the Israeli Military Governorate